The LaSalle Hotel is a hotel located in downtown Bryan, Texas, United States, a Texas cultural district. The hotel was opened in 1928 and was added to the National Register of Historic Places on May 26, 2000.

At its opening in 1928, the seven-story hotel was the tallest building in Bryan. The LaSalle had one hundred guest rooms, a ballroom and meeting space (both have since been converted to guest rooms). Several businesses, including a tailor, a barber and a cafe were located on the first floor. Businessman and city leader R. W. Howell built the hotel and the Howell family owned the hotel for over thirty years. J. C. Jacques bought the property in 1959 and converted it into a nursing home. The home was open until 1975 and then became a resident hotel with small apartments until it closed in 1980. The LaSalle sat empty for seventeen years when a private developer with city backing began renovations. The hotel reopened in 2000, which started the revitalization of downtown Bryan. The hotel faltered though and the City of Bryan stepped in to keep it open.

The LaSalle currently has 55 rooms and suites and has been newly renovated into what it is now known as the luxurious LaSalle Boutique Hotel and Downtown Elixir and Spirits.

Notes

References

External links
 

Hotels in Texas
Buildings and structures in Brazos County, Texas
Hotel buildings on the National Register of Historic Places in Texas
Hotels established in 1928
Hotel buildings completed in 1928
Bryan, Texas
National Register of Historic Places in Brazos County, Texas
1928 establishments in Texas